Charles Christopher Frost (November 11, 1805 – March 16, 1880) was an American mycologist. He described several species of fungi from the New England area of the United States. In one paper, Frost described 22 new species of boletes, and he was later credited with the discovery of three additional species. His personal herbarium of specimens were given to the University of Vermont in 1902. Portions of his collection today are distributed between the Farlow Herbarium at Harvard University, the New York State Museum, the Bell Museum of Natural History, and the Buffalo Museum of Science.

Early life
Frost was born in Brattleboro, Vermont, on November 11, 1805. His parents were shoemaker James Frost and Elizabeth Stewart, daughter of an officer in the American Revolution. When he was fifteen, Frost left school after being hit with a ruler by a teacher, and assisted his father with his business. Although Frost had developed a prior interest in the natural sciences, his interest in botany grew after meeting with physician Willard Parker, who recommended Frost undertake botanical walks to alleviate the symptoms of his dyspepsia. Frost started studying the mosses and lichens he encountered on these walks. He later investigated fungi, particularly the bolete mushrooms.

Eponymous taxa

Agaricus frostianus Peck 1883
Amanita frostiana Peck 1900
Amanita subfrostiana Zhu L.Yang 1997
Boletus frostii J.L.Russell
Boletus pseudofrostii B. Ortiz 2007
Cetraria fahlunensis var. frostii (Tuck.) Zahlbr. 1929
Cetraria hepatizon var. frostii (Tuck.) Räsänen 1952
Diatrype frostii (Peck) Cooke 1886
Diatrypella frostii Peck 1878
Dirinaria frostii (Tuck.) Hale & W.L.Culb. 1970
Frostiella Murrill 1942
Lecanora frostii (Tuck.) Tuck. 1866
Lycoperdon frostii Peck 1879
Parmelia frostii Tuck. 1882
Phyllosticta afrostyracis C.Moreau 1947
Physcia frostii (Tuck.) Zahlbr. 1930
Pyxine frostii (Tuck.) Tuck. 1882
Squamaria frostii Tuck. 1858
Suillellus frostii (J.L.Russell) Murrill 1909
Tubiporus frostii (J.L.Russell) Imai{?} 1968
Venenarius frostianus (Peck) Murrill 1913

Species described
Boletus arcuatus Frost
Boletus chromapes Frost 1874
Boletus chromopus Frost
Boletus decorus Frost 1874
Boletus firmus Frost 1874
Boletus griseus Frost 1878
Boletus innixus Frost 1874
Boletus limatulus Frost 1874
Boletus macrosporus Frost
Boletus magnisporus Frost 1874
Boletus miniato-olivaceus Frost 1874
Boletus pallidus Frost 1874
Boletus peckii Frost 1878
Boletus roxanae Frost 1874
Boletus rubens Frost
Boletus russellii Frost 1878
Boletus salmonicolor Frost 1874
Boletus serotinus Frost 1877
Boletus sordidus Frost 1874
Boletus speciosus Frost 1874
Boletus submoricolor Frost 1877
Hygrophorus flavodiscus Frost 1884
Hygrophorus fuligineus Frost 1884
Polyporus morganii Frost 1879
Russula compacta Frost 1879
Russula flavida Frost 1879
Urocystis cepulae Frost 1877
Uromyces cepulae Frost

References

1805 births
1880 deaths
American mycologists
People from Brattleboro, Vermont